The Golden Eagle Award for Best Television Motion Picture (Russian: Золотой Орёл для лучший игровой телевизионный фильм) is one of twenty award categories presented annually by the National Academy of Motion Pictures Arts and Sciences of Russia. It is one of the Golden Eagle Awards, which were conceived by Nikita Mikhalkov as a counterweight to the annual Nika Awards given by the Russian Academy of Cinema Arts and Sciences.

Each year the members of the academy choose three nominees from among television films (movies directly released to television), which have been popular in Russia since the 1950s because of their inexpensive production. The movies therefore typically have only Russian titles. The category excludes motion pictures and documentaries, which have their own categories. The first film to be awarded was Spetsnaz. The name of the award was changed to Golden Eagle Award for Best Mini-Series (up to 8 episodes) in 2004 and later Golden Eagle Award for Best Telefilm or Mini-Series (up to 10 episodes) in 2006, which merged mini-series with telefilms. Since then, the award has been won only by mini-series; no telefilms have received the prize since. The most recent award in 2020 was made to Odesskiy parokhod (Одесский пароход), which is based on Mikhail Zhvanetsky's works and the first television movie to win the prize since the change. Vladimir Khotinenko holds the record for the most wins, with three; other people with multiple nominations are Gleb Panfilov, Boris Khlebnikov (both with two wins), Andrei Malyokov (with two wins and three nominations), Vladimir Bortko, Egor Baranov, Alexey Andrianov (each with one win and one nomination), Bakhtyar Khudojnazarov, and Yuri Moroz (both with two nominations but no wins).

Nominations and awards

Key

References

External links
 

Television
Lists of films by award